Governor Morton may refer to:

Joseph Morton (governor) (died 1721), Governor of the Province of Carolina from 1682 to 1684, and in 1686
Julius Sterling Morton (1832–1902), Acting Governor of Nebraska in 1861
Levi P. Morton (1824–1920), 31st Governor of New York
Marcus Morton (1784–1864), 16th and 18th Governor of Massachusetts
Oliver P. Morton (1823–1877), 14th Governor of Indiana